Jim Parrish (born August 25, 1946) is a businessman and former politician from the U.S. state of Kansas. During the 1970s, he served as a Democrat in both the Kansas House of Representatives and the Kansas State Senate.

Parrish was born in Great Bend, Kansas. He married Nancy Buchele and moved to Topeka to attend law school in 1970. He ran for the Kansas House in the 1972 elections, serving one term, and then ran for the State Senate in 1974. He was re-elected in 1978, but resigned his seat in January 1980 due to business concerns. The seat was filled by his wife.

During the mid-1980s, Jim Parrish was named chair of the Kansas Democratic Party. He also worked as a hotelier and commercial property manager and developer, and in 2010 was inducted into the Topeka Business Hall of Fame.

References

1946 births
Living people
20th-century American politicians
People from Topeka, Kansas
Democratic Party members of the Kansas House of Representatives
Democratic Party Kansas state senators
State political party chairs of Kansas
American hoteliers
Real estate and property developers
Spouses of Kansas politicians